"Big Heart" is a debut song recorded by American country music group Gibson/Miller Band.  It was released in November 1992 as the first single from the album Where There's Smoke....  The song reached #37 on the Billboard Hot Country Songs & Tracks chart. The song was written by group members Dave Gibson and Blue Miller, along with Freddy Weller.

Critical reception
The song was promoted to DJs with a special cassette and a questionnaire to see if DJs could guess the identities of Gibson and Miller.

A review in Gavin Report wrote of the song, "They've come up with a very rockin' sound -are we calling this 'Turbo Country?'"

Chart performance

References

1992 debut singles
1992 songs
Gibson/Miller Band songs
Songs written by Dave Gibson (American songwriter)
Songs written by Freddy Weller
Song recordings produced by Doug Johnson (record producer)
Epic Records singles